Ponte Duca d'Aosta is a bridge that links Lungotevere Flaminio to Piazza Lauro De Bosis, in Rome (Italy), in the Flaminio and Della Vittoria quarters.

Description 
The bridge, dedicated to Prince Emanuele Filiberto of Savoy-Aosta, 2nd Duke of Aosta, was designed by architect Vincenzo Fasolo; the building started in 1939 and the inauguration took place in 1942.

The reinforced concrete bridge has a single arch and is 220 m (722 ft) long and 30 m (98 ft) wide; at both extremities are placed two pairs of shafts, whose façades are decorated with high-relieves by the Tuscan sculptor Vico Consorti, illustrating war scenes on the rivers Isonzo, Tagliamento, Sile and Adige.

The bridge links the Flaminio quarter to the Foro Italico.

External links 
 Map of the bridges of Rome
 The form on Structurae, the database of structural and civil engineering works

Bridges completed in 1942
Duca D'Aosta
Stone bridges in Italy
Road bridges in Italy
Rome Q. I Flaminio
Rome Q. XV Della Vittoria
1942 establishments in Italy